Several independent candidates contested the 1977 Ontario provincial election, although none were elected.  Information about these candidates may be found here.

Willis Cummins (Oakwood)

Cummins was 39 years old at the time of the election, and was a part-time teacher with the North York Board of Education.  He also described himself as a former journalist for Contrast.  In 1973, he wrote an article for The Globe and Mail newspaper on emergence of a black film industry in North America.  He received 170 votes (0.80%), finishing fifth against New Democratic Party incumbent Tony Grande.

Footnotes

1977